Spaceflight began in the 20th century following theoretical and practical breakthroughs by Konstantin Tsiolkovsky, Robert H. Goddard, and Hermann Oberth. First successful large-scale rocket programs were initiated in the 1920s Germany by Fritz von Opel and Max Valier, and eventually in Nazi Germany by Wernher von Braun. The Soviet Union took the lead in the post-war Space Race, launching the first satellite, the first man and the first woman into orbit. The United States caught up with, and then passed, their Soviet rivals during the mid-1960s, landing the first men on the Moon in 1969. In the same period, France, the United Kingdom, Japan and China were concurrently developing more limited launch capabilities.

Following the end of the Space Race, spaceflight has been characterized by greater international cooperation, cheaper access to low Earth orbit and an expansion of commercial ventures. Interplanetary probes have visited all of the planets in the Solar System, and humans have remained in orbit for long periods aboard space stations such as Mir and the ISS. Most recently, China has emerged as the third nation with the capability to launch independent crewed missions, whilst operators in the commercial sector have developed reusable booster systems and craft launched from airborne platforms.

In 2020, SpaceX became the first commercial operator to successfully launch a crewed mission to the International Space Station with Crew Dragon Demo-2, whose name varies depending on the organization.

Background

At the beginning of the 20th century, there was a burst of scientific investigation into interplanetary travel, inspired by fiction by writers such as Jules Verne (From the Earth to the Moon, Around the Moon) and H.G. Wells (The First Men in the Moon, The War of the Worlds).

The first realistic proposal for spaceflight goes back to Konstantin Tsiolkovsky. His most famous work, "" (Issledovanie mirovikh prostranstv reaktivnimi priborami, or The Exploration of Cosmic Space by Means of Reaction Devices), was published in 1903, but this theoretical work was not widely influential outside Russia.

Spaceflight became an engineering possibility with the work of Robert H. Goddard's publication in 1919 of his paper "A Method of Reaching Extreme Altitudes", where his application of the de Laval nozzle to liquid fuel rockets gave sufficient power for interplanetary travel to become possible.  This paper was highly influential on Hermann Oberth and Wernher Von Braun, later key players in spaceflight.

Fritz von Opel was instrumental in popularizing rockets as means of propulsion for vehicles. In the 1920s, he initiated together with Max Valier, co-founder of the "Verein für Raumschiffahrt", the world's first rocket program, Opel-RAK, leading to speed records for automobiles, rail vehicles and the first crewed rocket-powered flight in September 1929. Months earlier in 1928, one of his rocket-powered prototypes, the Opel RAK2, reached piloted by von Opel himself at the AVUS speedway in Berlin a record speed of 238 km/h, watched by 3000 spectators and world media, among them Fritz Lang, director of Metropolis and Woman in the Moon, world boxing champion Max Schmeling and many more sports and show business celebrities. A world record for rail vehicles was reached with RAK3 and a top speed of 256 km/h. After these successes, von Opel piloted the world's first public rocket-powered flight using Opel RAK.1, a rocket plane designed by Julius Hatry. World media reported on these efforts, including UNIVERSAL Newsreel of the US, causing as "Raketen-Rummel" or "Rocket Rumble" immense global public excitement, and in particular in Germany, where inter alia Wernher von Braun was highly influenced. The Great Depression led to an end of the Opel-RAK program, but Max Valier continued the efforts. After switching from solid-fuel to liquid-fuel rockets, he died while testing and is considered the first fatality of the dawning space age.

 After analysing and realising the shortcomings of solid-fuel rockets, Opel RAK became enthralled with liquid-propellant propulsion, building and testing them in the late 1920s in Rüsselsheim. According to Max Valier's account, Opel RAK rocket designer, Friedrich Wilhelm Sander launched two liquid-fuel rockets at Opel Rennbahn in Rüsselsheim on April 10 and April 12, 1929. These Opel RAK rockets have been the first European, and after Goddard the world's second, liquid-fuel rockets in history. In his book “Raketenfahrt” Valier describes the size of the rockets as 21 cm in diameter and with a length of 74 cm, weighing 7 kg empty and 16 kg with fuel. The maximum thrust was 45 to 50 kp, with a total burning time of 132 seconds. These properties indicate a gas pressure pumping. The first missile rose so quickly that Sander lost sight of it. Two days later, a second unit was ready to go, Sander tied a 4,000-meter-long rope to the rocket. After 2000 m or rope had been unwound, the line broke and this rocket also disappeared in the area, probably near the Opel proving ground and racetrack in Rüsselsheim, the "Rennbahn". The main purpose of these tests was to develop the propulsion system for the aircraft for crossing the English channel. Spaceflight historian Frank H. Winter, curator at National Air and Space Museum in Washington, DC, confirms the Opel group was working, in addition to their solid-fuel rockets used for land-speed records and the world's first crewed rocket-plane flights, on liquid-fuel rockets (SPACEFLIGHT, Vol. 21,2, Feb. 1979): In a cabled exclusive to The New York Times on 30 September 1929, Fritz von Opel is quoted as saying: "Sander and I now want to transfer the liquid rocket from the laboratory to practical use. With the liquid rocket I hope to be the first man to thus fly across the English Channel. I will not rest until I have accomplished that." At a speech on the donation of a RAK 2 replica to the Deutsches Museum, von Opel mentioned also Opel engineer Josef Schaberger as a key collaborator. "He belonged," von Opel said, "with the same enthusiasm as Sander to our small secret group, one of the tasks of which was to hide all the preparations from my father, because his paternal apprehensions led him to believe that I was cut out for something better than being a rocket researchist. Schaberger supervised all the details involved in construction and assembly (of rocket cars), and every time I sat behind the wheel with a few hundred pounds of explosives in my rear, and made the first contact, I did so with a feeling of total security [...] As early as 1928, Mr. Schaberger and I developed a liquid rocket, which was definitely the first permanently operating rocket in which the explosive was injected into the combustion chamber and simultaneously cooled using pumps. [...] We used benzol as the fuel," von Opel continued, "and nitrogen tetroxide as the oxidizer. This rocket was installed in a Mueller-Griessheim aircraft and developed a thrust of 70 kg (154 lb.)."

By May 1929, the engine produced a thrust of 200 kg (440 lb.) "for longer than fifteen minutes and in July 1929, the Opel RAK collaborators were able to attain powered phases of more than thirty minutes for thrusts of 300 kg (660-lb.) at Opel's works in Rüsselsheim," again according to Max Valier's account. The Great Depression brought an end to the Opel RAK activities. Valier's, who died while experimenting in 1930, and Sander's work on liquid-fuel rockets was confiscated by the German military, the Heereswaffenamt, and integrated into the activities under General Walter Dornberger in the early and mid-1930s in a field near Berlin. 
An amateur rocket group, the VfR, co-founded by Max Valier, included Wernher von Braun, who eventually became the head of the army research station that designed the V-2 rocket weapon for the Nazis. Sander was arrested by Gestapo in 1935, when private rocket-engineering became forbidden in Germany, was convicted of treason, sentenced to five years in prison and forced to sell his company; he died in 1938.

In 1929, the Slovene officer Hermann Noordung was the first to imagine a complete space station in his book The Problem of Space Travel.

The first rocket to reach space was a German V-2 rocket, on a vertical test flight in June 1944. After the war ended, the research and development branch of the (British) Ordinance Office organised Operation Backfire which, in October 1945, assembled enough V-2 missiles and supporting components to enable the launch of three (possibly four, depending on source consulted) of them from a site near Cuxhaven in northern Germany. Although these launches were inclined and the rockets didn't achieve the altitude necessary to be regarded as sub-orbital spaceflight, the Backfire report remains the most extensive technical documentation of the rocket, including all support procedures, tailored vehicles and fuel composition.

Subsequently, the British Interplanetary Society proposed an enlarged man-carrying version of the V-2 called Megaroc. The plan, written in 1946, envisaged a three-year development programme culminating in the launch of test pilot Eric Brown on a sub-orbital mission in 1949.

The decision by the Ministry of Supply under Attlee's government to concentrate on research into nuclear power generation and sub-sonic passenger jet aircraft over supersonic atmospheric flight and spaceflight delayed the introduction of both of the latter, although only by a year in the case of supersonic flight, as the data from the Miles M.52 was handed to Bell Aircraft.

In 1947, the US sent the first animals in space, fruit flies, although not into orbit, through a V-2 rocket launched from White Sands Missile Range, New Mexico. On June 14, 1949, the US launched the first mammal into space, a rhesus macaque monkey named Albert II, on a sub-orbital flight.

Space Race

About three decades after the crewed Opel RAK flights, and a decade after the Megaroc proposal, true orbital space flight, both uncrewed and crewed, was developed by the Soviet Union and the United States during the Cold War, in a competition dubbed the Space Race.

First artificial satellite

The race began in 1957 when both the US and the USSR made statements announced they planned to launch artificial satellites during the 18-month long International Geophysical Year of July 1957 to December 1958. On July 29, 1957, the US announced a planned launch of the Vanguard by the spring of 1958, and on July 31, the USSR announced it would launch a satellite in the fall of 1957.

On October 4, 1957, the Soviet Union launched Sputnik 1, the first artificial satellite of Earth in the history of mankind.

On November 3, 1957, the Soviet Union launched the second satellite, Sputnik 2, and the first to carry a living animal into orbit, a dog named Laika. Sputnik 3 was launched on May 15, 1958, and carried a large array of instruments for geophysical research and provided data on pressure and composition of the upper atmosphere, concentration of charged particles, photons in cosmic rays, heavy nuclei in cosmic rays, magnetic and electrostatic fields, and meteoric particles.

After a series of failures with the program, the US succeeded with Explorer 1, which became the first US satellite in space, on February 1, 1958. This carried scientific instrumentation and detected the theorized Van Allen radiation belt.

The US public shock over Sputnik 1 became known as the Sputnik crisis. On July 29, 1958, the US Congress passed legislation turning the National Advisory Committee for Aeronautics (NACA) into the National Aeronautics and Space Administration (NASA) with responsibility for the nation's civilian space programs. In 1959, NASA began Project Mercury to launch single-man capsules into Earth orbit and chose a corps of seven astronauts introduced as the Mercury Seven.

First man in space

On April 12, 1961, the USSR opened the era of crewed spaceflight, with the flight of the first cosmonaut (Russian name for space travelers), Yuri Gagarin. Gagarin's flight, part of the Soviet Vostok space exploration program, took 108 minutes and consisted of a single orbit of the Earth.

On August 7, 1961, Gherman Titov, another Soviet cosmonaut, became the second man in orbit during his Vostok 2 mission.

By June 16, 1963, the Union launched a total of six Vostok cosmonauts, two pairs of them flying concurrently, and accumulating a total of 260 cosmonaut-orbits and just over sixteen cosmonaut-days in space.

On May 5, 1961, the US launched its first suborbital Mercury astronaut, Alan Shepard, in the Freedom 7 capsule. Unlike Gagarin, Shepard manually controlled his spacecraft's attitude and landed inside it thus technically making Freedom 7 the first complete human spaceflight by then FAI definitions, but later it recognized that Gagarin was the first human to fly into space. Prior to that on January 31, through NASA's Mercury-Redstone 2 mission, the chimpanzee Ham became the first Hominidae in space.

First woman in space

The first woman in space was former civilian parachutist Valentina Tereshkova, who entered orbit on June 16, 1963, aboard the Soviet mission Vostok 6. The chief Soviet spacecraft designer, Sergey Korolyov, conceived of the idea to recruit a female cosmonaut corps and launch two women concurrently on Vostok 5/6. However, his plan was changed to launch a male first in Vostok 5, followed shortly afterward by Tereshkova. The then first secretary of the Soviet Union, Nikita Khrushchev, spoke to Tereshkova by radio during her flight.

On November 3, 1963, Tereshkova married fellow cosmonaut Andrian Nikolayev, who had previously flown on Vostok 3. On June 8, 1964, she gave birth to the first child conceived by two space travelers. The couple divorced in 1982, and Tereshkova went on to become a prominent member of the Communist Party of the Soviet Union.

The second woman to fly to space was aviator Svetlana Savitskaya, aboard Soyuz T-7 on August 18, 1982.

Competition develops
Khrushchev pressured Korolyov to quickly produce greater space achievements in competition with the announced Gemini and Apollo plans. Rather than allowing him to develop his plans for a crewed Soyuz spacecraft, he was forced to make modifications to squeeze two or three men into the Vostok capsule, calling the result Voskhod. Only two of these were launched. Voskhod 1 was the first spacecraft with a crew of three, who could not wear space suits because of size and weight constrictions. Alexei Leonov made the first spacewalk when he left the Voskhod 2 on March 8, 1965. He was almost lost in space when he had extreme difficulty fitting his inflated space suit back into the cabin through an airlock, and a landing error forced him and Voskhod 2 crewmate Pavel Belyayev to be lost in dense woods for hours before being found by the recovery crew and rescued days later.

The start of crewed Gemini missions was delayed a year later than NASA had planned, but ten largely successful missions were launched in 1965 and 1966, allowing the US to overtake the Soviet lead by achieving space rendezvous (Gemini 6A) and docking (Gemini 8) of two vehicles, long duration flights of eight days (Gemini 5) and fourteen days (Gemini 7), and demonstrating the use of extra-vehicular activity to do useful work outside a spacecraft (Gemini 12).

The USSR made no crewed flights during this period but continued to develop its Soyuz craft and secretly accepted Kennedy's implicit lunar challenge, designing Soyuz variants for lunar orbit and landing. They also attempted to develop the N1, a large, crewed Moon-capable launch vehicle similar to the US Saturn V.

As both nations rushed to get their new spacecraft flying with men, the intensity of the competition caught up to them in early 1967, when they suffered their first crew fatalities. On January 27, the entire crew of Apollo 1, "Gus" Grissom, Ed White, and Roger Chaffee, were killed by suffocation in a fire that swept through their cabin during a ground test approximately one month before their planned launch. On April 24, the single pilot of Soyuz 1, Vladimir Komarov, was killed in a crash when his landing parachutes tangled, after a mission cut short by electrical and control system problems. Both accidents were determined to be caused by design defects in the spacecraft, which were corrected before crewed flights resumed.

The US conducted the first crewed spaceflight to leave Earth orbit and orbit the Moon on December 21, 1968, with the Apollo 8 space mission. Later they succeeded in achieving President Kennedy's goal on July 20, 1969, with the landing of Apollo 11. Neil Armstrong and Buzz Aldrin became the first men to set foot on the Moon. Six such successful landings were achieved through 1972, with one failure on Apollo 13.

The N1 rocket suffered four catastrophic uncrewed launch failures between 1969 and 1972, and the Soviet government officially discontinued its crewed lunar program on June 24, 1974, when Valentin Glushko succeeded Korolyov as General Spacecraft Designer.

Both nations went on to fly relatively small, non-permanent crewed space laboratories Salyut and Skylab, using their Soyuz and Apollo craft as shuttles. The US launched only one Skylab, but the USSR launched a total of seven "Salyuts", three of which were secretly Almaz military crewed reconnaissance stations, which carried "defensive" cannons. Crewed reconnaissance stations were found to be a bad idea since uncrewed satellites could do the job much more cost-effectively. The United States Air Force had planned a crewed reconnaissance station, the Manned Orbital Laboratory, which was cancelled in 1969. The Soviets cancelled Almaz in 1978.

In a season of detente, the two competitors declared an end to the race and literally shook hands on July 17, 1975, with the Apollo-Soyuz Test Project, where the two craft docked, and the crews exchanged visits.

By programs

United States

Until the 21st century, space programs of the United States were exclusively operated by government agencies. In the 21st century, several aerospace companies began efforts at developing a private space industry, with SpaceX being the most successful so far.

NASA

Project Mercury

Project Mercury was the first human spaceflight program of the United States, running from 1958 through 1963. Its goal was to put a person into Earth orbit and return them safely, ideally before the Soviet Union. John Glenn became the first American to orbit the Earth on February 20, 1962, aboard the Mercury-Atlas 6.

Project Gemini

Project Gemini was NASA's second human spaceflight program. The program ran from 1961 to 1966. The program pioneered the orbital maneuvers required for space rendezvous. Ed White became the first American to make an extravehicular activity (EVA, or "space walk"), on June 3, 1965, during Gemini 4. Gemini 6A and 7 accomplished the first space rendezvous on December 15, 1965. Gemini 8 achieved the first space docking with an uncrewed Agena Target Vehicle on March 16, 1966. Gemini 8 was also the first US spacecraft to experience in-space critical failure endangering the lives of the crew.

Apollo program

The Apollo program was the third human spaceflight program carried out by NASA. The program's goal was to orbit and land crewed vehicles on the Moon. The program ran from 1969 to 1972. Apollo 8 was the first human spaceflight to leave Earth orbit and orbit the Moon on December 21, 1968. Neil Armstrong and Buzz Aldrin became the first men to set foot on the Moon during the Apollo 11 mission on July 20, 1969.

Skylab

The Skylab program's goal was to create the first space station of NASA. The program marked the last launch of the Saturn V rocket on May 14, 1973. Many experiments were performed on board, including unprecedented solar studies. The longest crewed mission of the program was Skylab 4 which lasted 84 days, from November 16, 1973 to February 8, 1974. The total mission duration was 2249 days, with Skylab finally falling from orbit over Australia on July 11, 1979.

Space Shuttle

Although its pace slowed, space exploration continued after the end of the Space Race. The United States launched the first reusable spacecraft, the Space Shuttle, on the 20th anniversary of Gagarin's flight, April 12, 1981. On November 15, 1988, the Soviet Union duplicated this with an uncrewed flight of the only Buran-class shuttle to fly, its first and only reusable spacecraft. It was never used again after the first flight; instead, the Soviet Union continued to develop space stations using the Soyuz craft as the crew shuttle.

Sally Ride became the first American woman in space in 1983. Eileen Collins was the first female Shuttle pilot, and with Shuttle mission STS-93 in July 1999 she became the first woman to command a US spacecraft.

The United States continued missions to the ISS and other goals with the high-cost Shuttle system, which was retired in 2011.

Soviet Union

Sputnik

The Sputnik 1 became the first artificial Earth satellite on 4 October 1957. The satellite transmitted a radio signal, but had no sensors otherwise. Studying the Sputnik 1 allowed scientists to calculate the drag from the upper atmosphere by measuring position and speed of the satellite. Sputnik 1 broadcast for 21 days until its batteries depleted on 4 October 1957, and the satellite finally fell from orbit on 4 January 1958.

Luna programme

The Luna programme was a series of uncrewed robotic satellite launches with the goal of studying the Moon. The program ran from 1959 to 1976 and consisted of 15 successful missions, the program achieved many first achievements and collected data on the Moon's chemical composition, gravity, temperature, and radiation. Luna 2 became the first human-made object to make contact with the Moon's surface in September 1959. Luna 3 returned the first photographs of the far side of the Moon in October 1959.

Vostok

The Vostok Programme was the first Soviet spaceflight project to put Soviet citizens into low Earth orbit and return them safely. The programme carried out six crewed spaceflights between 1961 and 1963. The program was the first program to put humans into space, with Yuri Gagarin becoming the first man in space on April 12, 1961, aboard the Vostok 1. Gherman Titov became the first person to stay in orbit for a full day on August 7, 1961, aboard the Vostok 2. Valentina Tereshkova became the first woman in space on June 16, 1963, aboard the Vostok 6.

Voskhod

The Voskhod programme began in 1964 and consisted of two crewed flights before the program was canceled by the Soyuz programme in 1966. Voskhod 1 launched on October 12, 1964, and was the first crewed spaceflight with a multi-crewed vehicle. Alexei Leonov performed the first spacewalk aboard Voskhod 2 on March 18, 1965.

Salyut

The Salyut programme was the first space station program undertaken by the Soviet Union. The goal was to carry out long-term research into the problems of living in space and a variety of astronomical, biological and Earth-resources experiments. The program ran from 1971 to 1986. Salyut 1, the first station in the program, became the world's first crewed space station.

Soyuz programme

The Soyuz programme was initiated by the soviet space program in the 1960s and continues as the responsibility of roscosmos to this day. The program currently consists of 140 completed flights, and since the retirement of the US Space Shuttle has been the only craft to transport humans. The program's original goal was part of a program to put a cosmonaut on the Moon and later became crucial to the construction of the Mir space station.

Mir

Buran

International Space Station

Recent space exploration has proceeded, to some extent in worldwide cooperation, the high point of which was the construction and operation of the International Space Station (ISS). At the same time, the international space race between smaller space powers since the end of the 20th century can be considered the foundation and expansion of markets of commercial rocket launches and space tourism.

The United States continued other space exploration, including major participation with the ISS with its own modules. It also planned a set of uncrewed Mars probes, military satellites, and more. The Constellation program, began by President George W. Bush in 2005, aimed to launch the Orion spacecraft by 2018. A subsequent return to the Moon by 2020 was to be followed by crewed flights to Mars, but the program was canceled in 2010 in favor of encouraging commercial US human launch capabilities.

Russia, a successor to the Soviet Union, has high potential but smaller funding. Its own space programs, some of a military nature, perform several functions. They offer a wide commercial launch service while continuing to support the ISS with several of their own modules. They also operate crewed and cargo spacecraft which continued after the US Shuttle program ended.  They are developing a new multi-function Orel spacecraft for use in 2020 and have plans to perform human Moon missions as well.

European Space Agency

The European Space Agency has taken the lead in commercial uncrewed launches since the introduction of the Ariane 4 in 1988 but is in competition with NASA, Russia, Sea Launch (private), China, India, and others. The ESA-designed crewed shuttle Hermes and space station Columbus were under development in the late 1980s in Europe; however, these projects were canceled, and Europe did not become the third major "space power".

The European Space Agency has launched various satellites, has utilized the crewed Spacelab module aboard US shuttles, and has sent probes to comets and Mars. It also participates in ISS with its own module and the uncrewed cargo spacecraft ATV.

Currently, ESA has a program for the development of an independent multi-function crewed spacecraft CSTS scheduled for completion in 2018. Further goals include an ambitious plan called the Aurora Programme, which intends to send a human mission to Mars soon after 2030. A set of various landmark missions to reach this goal are currently under consideration.  The ESA has a multi-lateral partnership and plans for spacecraft and further missions with foreign participation and co-funding.
ESA is also developing Galileo program which seeks to give independence to the EU from the American GPS.

China

Since 1956 the Chinese have had a space program which was aided early on from 1957-1960 by the Soviets. "Dong Fang Hong I" was launched on 24 April 1970 and was the first satellite to be launched by the Chinese. With increased economy and technology strength in the following decades, especially since the early 21st century, China has made significant achievements in many aspects of space activities. It has developed a sizable family of Long March rockets, including Long March 5, the launch vehicle with the highest payload capacity in Asia . China launched more than 140 spaceflights between 2015 and 2020. China is operating multiple satellite systems, including communication, Earth imaging, weather forecast, ocean monitoring. BeiDou Navigation Satellite System, the satellite navigation system developed, launched, and operated by China, is one of the four core system providers of the International Committee on Global Navigation Satellite Systems.

The US Pentagon released a report in 2006, detailing concerns about China's growing presence in space, including its capability for military action. In 2007 China tested a ballistic missile designed to destroy satellites in orbit, which was followed by a US demonstration of a similar capability in 2008.

China Manned Space Program

The China Manned Space Program, China's human spaceflight program, began in 1992. Following Shenzhou 5, the first successful crewed spaceflight mission in 2003 which made China the third country with independent human spaceflight capability, China has developed critical capabilities including EVA, space docking and berthing and space station. Currently, China's Tiangong Space Station is under construction and the phase one of the project is expected to be completed in 2022.

Chinese Lunar Exploration Program

As the first step of distance outer space exploration, the Chinese Lunar Exploration Program was approved in 2004. It launched two lunar orbiters: Chang'e 1 and Chang'e 2 in 2007 and 2010 respectively. On 14 December 2013, China successfully soft-landed Chang'e 3 Moon lander and its rover Yutu on the Moon's surface, becoming the first Asian country to do so. This was followed by Chang'e 4, the first soft landing on the far side of the Moon, in 2019 and Chang'e 5, the first lunar sample return mission conducted by an Asian country, in 2020, marking the completion of the three goals (orbiting, landing, returning) of the first stage of the program.

Planetary Exploration of China

China began its first interplanetary exploration attempt in 2011 by sending Yinghuo-1, a Mars orbiter, in a joint mission with Russia. Yet it failed to leave Earth orbit due to the failure of the Russian launch vehicle. As a result, the Chinese space agency then embarked on its independent Mars mission. In July 2020, China launched Tianwen-1, which included an orbiter, a lander, and a rover, on a Long March 5 rocket to Mars. Tianwen-1 was inserted into Mars orbit on 10 February 2021, followed by a successful landing and deployment of the Zhurong rover on 14 May 2021, making China the second country in the world which successfully soft-landed a fully operational spacecraft on Mars surface.

France
Emmanuel Macron announced on 13 July 2019 the project to create a military command specialising in space, which would be based in Toulouse.

This command should be operational in September 2020 within the Air Force to become the Air and Space Force. Its purpose will be to strengthen France's space power in order to defend its satellites and deepen its knowledge of space. It will also aim to compete with other nations in this new place of strategic confrontation.

Japan

Japan's space agency, the Japan Aerospace Exploration Agency, is a major space player in Asia. While not maintaining a commercial launch service, Japan has deployed a module in the ISS and operates an uncrewed cargo spacecraft, the H-II Transfer Vehicle.

JAXA has plans to launch a Mars fly-by probe. Their lunar probe, SELENE, is touted as the most sophisticated lunar exploration mission in the post-Apollo era. Japan's Hayabusa probe was mankind's first sample return from an asteroid. IKAROS was the first operational solar sail.

Although Japan developed the HOPE-X, Kankoh-maru, and Fuji crewed capsule spacecraft, none of them have been launched. Japan's current ambition is to deploy a new crewed spacecraft by 2025 and to establish a Moon base by 2030.

Taiwan

The National Space Organization (NSPO; formerly known as the National Space Program Office) and the National Chung-Shan Institute of Science and Technology are the national civilian space agencies of the democratic industrialized developed country of Taiwan under the auspices of the Ministry of Science and Technology (Taiwan). The National Chung-Shan Institute of Science and Technology is involved in designing and building Taiwanese nuclear weapons, hypersonic missiles, spacecraft and rockets for launching satellites while the National Space Organization is involved in space exploration, satellite construction, and satellite development as well as related technologies and infrastructure (including the FORMOSAT series of Earth observation satellites similar to NASA along with DARPA {In-Q-Tel} such as Google Earth {Keyhole, Inc} or so forth) and related research in astronautics, quantum physics, materials science with microgravity, aerospace engineering, remote sensing, astrophysics, atmospheric science, information science, design and construction of indigenous Taiwanese satellites and spacecraft, launching satellites and space probes into low Earth orbit. Additionally, a state of the art crewed spaceflight program is currently in development in Taiwan and is designed to compete directly with the crewed programs of China, United States and Russia. Active research is currently undergoing in the development and deployment of space-based weapons for the defense of national security in Taiwan.

India

ISRO 

Indian Space Research Organisation, India's national space agency, maintains an active space program. It operates a small commercial launch service and launched a successful uncrewed lunar mission dubbed Chandrayaan-1 in October 2007. India successfully launched an interplanetary mission, Mars Orbiter Mission, in 2013 which reached Mars in September 2014, hence becoming the first country in the world to do a Mars mission in its maiden attempt. On July 22, 2019, India sent Chandrayaan-2 to the Moon, whose Vikram lander crashed on the lunar south pole region on September 6.

Other nations
Cosmonauts and astronauts from other nations have flown in space, beginning with the flight of Vladimir Remek, a Czech, on a Soviet spacecraft on March 2, 1978. , a total of 536 people from 38 countries have gone into space according to the FAI guideline.

Private Companies

SpaceX (USA) 
SpaceX is also planning a fully reusable rocket named Starship. It consists of a first stage named Super Heavy and a second stage also named Starship.

Blue Origin 

Blue Origin made the first reusable space-capable rocket booster, New Shepard (it is suborbital, Falcon 9 was the first orbital). They also originally had the idea of landing rocket boosters on ships at sea, however, SpaceX replicated their idea and did it first. They lead the national team, which is designing a lunar lander and transfer vehicle (Integrated Lander Vehicle). They will contribute by modifying their Blue Moon lunar lander.

Bigelow Aerospace 

Bigelow Aerospace made the first commercial module in space (BEAM). They also designed and manufactured the first inflatable habitats in space (Genesis I and Genesis II). They also plan to make the first commercial space station around the moon (Lunar Depot), perhaps the first ever.

Northrop Grumman 

They make commercial resupply runs to the ISS with their Cygnus spacecraft. They also helped develop non-commercial spacecraft during the space race (Apollo LM as Grumman). They also are a part of the national team, led by Blue Origin which is designing a lunar lander and transfer vehicle (Integrated Lander Vehicle), partly based on Cygnus.

United Launch Alliance

Arianespace

Rocket Lab

See also

History of Space in Africa
History of aviation
List of crewed spacecraft
Timeline of spaceflight
Timeline of Solar System exploration
Human presence in space

Notes

References

Bibliogprahy

Further reading 

 Historic spacecraft